Bryan Lynn Shader (born 17 December 1961) is a professor of mathematics at the University of Wyoming. He received his Ph.D. from University of Wisconsin-Madison in 1990, his advisor was Professor Richard Brualdi. Shader is the Editor-in-chief of the Electronic Journal of Linear Algebra. He is also Associate Editor of other two journals, Linear Algebra and its Applications (since 2003) and Linear & Multilinear Algebra (since 2009). He is one of the most active mathematicians working on Combinatorial Matrix Theory. He is also noted for his monograph on matrices of sign-solvable linear systems. Besides organizing many workshops, he is a co-principal investigator of Math Teacher Leadership Program, a National Science Foundation project (2009–2014). Shader is special assistant to the Vice-President of Research of University of Wyoming.

Shader received the 2005 Burton W. Jones Distinguished Teaching Award from the Rocky Mountain Section of the Mathematical Association of America.

Personal life 
Bryan Shader has a daughter named Sarah Shader who graduated from the Massachusetts Institute of Technology with a degree in computer science.

Books 
 (With Richard Brualdi) Matrices of sign-solvable linear systems. Cambridge Tracts in Mathematics, 116, 1995
 (With Richard Brualdi) Graph and Matrices, Chapter 3 in Topics in Algebraic Graph Theory, Encyclopedia of Mathematics and its Applications, 102, Cambridge University Press, 2005
 Bipartite Graph and Matrices, Chapter 30, Handbook of Linear Algebra, CRC Press, 2007

References

Notes
 Bryan Shader at University of Wyoming website
 Math Sci-Net

External links

 Bryan Shader at the Mathematics Genealogy Project

20th-century American mathematicians
21st-century American mathematicians
Combinatorialists
University of Wisconsin–Madison alumni
University of Wyoming faculty
1961 births
Living people
Electronic Journal of Linear Algebra editors